Hotel for the Holidays is a romantic comedy film written by Maggie Lane and Margarita Matthews, directed by Ron Oliver, and starring Madelaine Petsch and Mena Massoud. It was released on Amazon Freevee on December 2, 2022.

Plot
The film revolves around the staff and guests at New York City's Hotel Fontaine during Christmastime. The personal and work life of the hotel's manager, Georgia, become entangled when she is torn between Luke, the hotel's resident chef, and Raymond, a former prince staying at the hotel over the holidays.

Cast
 Madelaine Petsch as Georgia
 Mena Massoud as Luke
 Max Lloyd-Jones as Prince Raymond
 AJ Zoldy as the Bodyguard
 Kayleigh Shikanai as Pandora
 Jamison Belushi as Kiki
 Neil Crone as Milton
 Jayne Eastwood as Florence

Production
Mena Massoud and Madelaine Petsch first met as guests on the talk show A Little Late with Lilly Singh. In August 2022, Massoud teased the release of Hotel for the Holidays by sharing a photo of himself with Petsch on Instagram. It was produced by Brad Krevoy's Motion Picture Corporation of America. The film is set in New York City but was filmed in Ottawa, Canada, primarily at the Fairmont Hotel.

Release
The trailer was released on November 9, 2022. The film was released on Amazon Freevee in the United States, United Kingdom, and Germany on December 2, 2022.

References

External links 
 

2020s English-language films
2022 romantic comedy films
Canadian romantic comedy films
Canadian Christmas comedy films
2020s Christmas comedy films